Gwendolyn Lemaitre (born 4 September 1986) is a French yacht racer who competed in the 2008 Summer Olympics.

References

External links 
 
 
 
 
 

1986 births
Living people
French female sailors (sport)
Olympic sailors of France
Sailors at the 2008 Summer Olympics – 470
Mediterranean Games medalists in sailing
Mediterranean Games silver medalists for France
Competitors at the 2005 Mediterranean Games
21st-century French women